The 2018–19 Illinois Fighting Illini men's basketball team represented the University of Illinois at Urbana–Champaign in the 2018–19 NCAA Division I men's basketball season. Led by second-year head coach Brad Underwood, the Illini played their home games at State Farm Center in Champaign, Illinois as members of the Big Ten Conference. The Illini finished the season 12–21, 7–13 in Big Ten play, to finish in a three-way tie for 10th place. Due to tie-breaking rules, they received the No. 11 seed in the Big Ten tournament where they defeated Northwestern in the first round before losing to Iowa in the second round.

Previous season
The Illini finished the 2017–18 season 14–18, 4–14 in Big Ten play to finish in a three-way tie for 11th place. As the No. 13 seed in the Big Ten tournament, they lost in the first round to Iowa.

Offseason

Player departures
On March 5, 2018 Mark Smith announced his decision to transfer to a new school, indicating he did not fit into Illinois' system moving forward. On March 15, Leron Black announced his decision to forgoing final year of eligibility to declare for the NBA draft after already graduating with his bachelor's degree. He intended to sign with an agent, ending his collegiate career. On March 26, Te'Jon Lucas and Michael Finke both announced they would transfer to other programs. Lucas announced he would transfer to Milwaukee to complete his two years of remaining eligibility after sitting out for a season. Finke announced he will transfer to Grand Canyon and have one year of immediate eligibility as a graduate transfer. In late April, Matic Vessel left the program and returned to his home country of Slovenia to explore his options to continue basketball. On June 7, 2018 Greg Eboigbodin announced his intent to transfer out of Illinois, which left Illinois with four returning scholarship players from the prior season. Eboigbodin announced on July 30, 2018 that he would transfer to Northeastern University.

2018 recruiting class
In October 2017, five-star point guard Ayo Dosunmu verbally committed to Illinois over Wake Forest at the flagship Jordan Brand Store on State Street in the Chicago Loop. Dosunmu signed his National Letter of Intent in November 2017 to attend Illinois. In March 2018, Dosunmu was named one of 26 high school seniors who will participate in the Jordan Brand Classic on April 8, 2018, at the Barclays Center in Brooklyn, New York. Dosunmu is the third Illini to be selected to play in the Jordan Classic, joining Dee Brown who played for the Red team in 2002 and Jalen Coleman-Lands who played in 2015. Dosunmu was also selected to play in the second annual Iverson Roundball Classic All-American Game that will take place in April 2018 at Souderton Area High School outside of Philadelphia, Pennsylvania.

Roster

Schedule and results 
The season will mark the first time in Big Ten history that the teams will play a 20-game conference schedule, setting a precedent for all Division I basketball. The new schedule will also include a regional component to increase the frequency of gamesamong teams in similar areas. Over the course of a six-year cycle (12 playing opportunities), in-state rivals will play each other 12 times, regional opponents will play 10 times, and all other teams will play nine times. Three in-state series that will be guaranteed home-and-homes: Illinois and Northwestern, Indiana and Purdue, and Michigan and Michigan State will always play twice.

|-
!colspan=9 style="background:#; color:#;"|Exhibition

|-
!colspan=9 style="background:#; color:#;"|Regular season

|-
!colspan=9 style="background:#; color:#;"|Big Ten tournament

Source

References

2018–19 Big Ten Conference men's basketball season
2018-19
2018 in sports in Illinois
2019 in sports in Illinois